Montville may refer to:

Places

Australia
Montville, Queensland

France
Montville, Seine-Maritime

United States
Montville, Connecticut
Montville, Maine
Montville, New Jersey
Montville Township, Geauga County, Ohio
Montville, Ohio
Montville Township, Medina County, Ohio

People
Leigh Montville (born 1943), American sports reporter and author

See also